Russell C. King Field is a baseball venue located in Spartanburg, South Carolina, United States.  It is home to the Wofford Terriers college baseball team of the Division I Southern Conference.  It has a capacity of 2,500 spectators.

Of the 2,500 spectator capacity, 833 is made up of permanent, chair-backed seating.  The remainder consists of berm-style seating down either foul line.  The field also features stadium lighting.

Naming
The field is named for Russell C. King, Wofford Class of 1956.  King played baseball during his time at the college.  His donation played a major role in the park's being built.  Prior to the construction of King Field, the Terriers had played at Duncan Park since beginning Division I play in 1996.

See also
 List of NCAA Division I baseball venues

References

College baseball venues in the United States
Baseball venues in South Carolina
Wofford Terriers baseball
Sports venues in Spartanburg County, South Carolina
Buildings and structures in Spartanburg, South Carolina